In Anglo-Saxon England, the reeve was a senior official with local responsibilities under the Crown, such as the chief magistrate of a town or district. After the Norman conquest, it was an office held by a man of lower rank, appointed as manager of a manor and overseer of the peasants. In this later role, historian H. R. Loyn observes, "he is the earliest English specialist in estate management."

Anglo-Saxon England
Before the Conquest, a reeve (Old English ġerēfa; similar to the titles greve/gräfe in the Low Saxon languages of Northern Germany) was an administrative officer who generally ranked lower than the ealdorman or earl. The Old English word ġerēfa was originally a general term, but soon acquired a more technical meaning.

Land was divided into a large number of hides—an area containing enough farmable land to support one household. Ten hides constituted a tithings, and the families living upon it (in theory, ten of them) were obliged to undertake an early form of neighbourhood watch, by a collective responsibility system called frankpledge.

Tithings were organised into groups of 10, called hundreds due to them containing 100 hides; in modern times, these ancient hundreds still mostly retain their historic boundaries, despite each generally now containing vastly more than a mere 100 families. Each hundred was supervised by a constable, and groups of hundreds were combined to form shires, with each shire being under the control of an earl. Each unit had a court, and an officer to implement decisions of that court: the reeve. Thus different types of reeves were attested, including high-reeve, town-reeve, port-reeve, shire-reeve (predecessor to the sheriff), reeve of the hundred, and the reeve of a manor.

The word is often rendered in Latin as praefectus (Modern English prefect), by the historian Bede, and some early Anglo-Saxon charters. West-Saxon charters prefer to reserve the term praefectus for the ealdormen (earls) themselves.

After the Conquest

After the Norman conquest, feudalism was introduced, forming a parallel administrative system to the local courts. The feudal system organised land on a manorial basis, with stewards acting as managers for the landlords. The Norman term describing the court functionary—bailiff—came to be used for reeves associated with lower level courts, and with the equivalent role in the feudal courts of landlords.

Courts fulfilled administrative, as well as judicial, functions, and on the manorial level its decisions could concern mundane field management, not just legal disputes. The manorial bailiff thus could be set tasks such as ensuring certain crops were gathered, as well as those like enforcing debt repayment. Sometimes, bailiffs would have assistants to carry out these tasks, and the term reeve now came to be used for this position—someone essentially assisting the steward, and sometimes a bailiff, by effectively performing day-to-day supervision of the work done on the land within a particular manor.

This reeve has been described as "the pivot man of the manorial system". He had to oversee the work which the peasants were bound to perform, as an obligation attached to their holding of land in the Manor, for the lord of the manor on the demesne land; such reeves acted generally as the overseer of the serfs and peasants on the estate. He was also responsible for many aspects of the finances of the manor such as the sale of produce, collection of monies and payment of accounts.

He was usually himself a peasant, and was chosen once a year, generally at Michaelmas. In some manors the reeve was appointed by the lord of the manor, but in others he was elected by the peasants, subject or not to a right of veto by the lord. It depended on the custom of the manor, but there was an increasing tendency for election to be favoured. No doubt an elected reeve was more willingly obeyed, and sometimes the peasants would be made financially liable if an elected reeve defaulted.

Although this reeve was subject to the steward, the steward might not always be resident within the manor, and may manage many, and would not usually concern himself with day-to-day working. A good reeve who carried out his duties efficiently, and was trusted by the lord and the peasants alike, was likely to stay in office more or less permanently. By the 14th century the reeve was often a permanent officer of the manor.

With the subsequent decline of the feudal system, and the subversion of its courts by the introduction of Justices of the Peace (magistrates), this use of reeve fell out of practice.

Depiction by Chaucer

There is an exceptional literary portrait of a reeve in the second half of the 14th century. The reeve is one of the pilgrims who are making their way to Canterbury in Chaucer's Canterbury Tales, and the Prologue paints a vivid picture of this man, who had originally been a carpenter but has served as reeve of a manor for many years and had grown old in service. The Reeve's Tale is the third story in the Canterbury Tales, in which Chaucer describes a highly efficient servant, impossible for any man to deceive or outwit, never in debt and knowing exactly how much the manor should produce. It is an early picture of a completely reliable accountant, rather a cold individual but indispensable.

See also
 High-reeve
 Reeve (Canada)
 Sheriff
 Verderer

References

External links

 Medieval Sourcebook: Manorial Management & Organization, c. 1275

Anglo-Saxon law
Anglo-Saxon society
Feudalism in England
Obsolete occupations